Knemodynerus is a genus of potter wasps distributed through the Palearctic, Afrotropical, Indomalayan and Australasian regions.
The species currently classified in the genus are:

 Knemodynerus aequabilis Gusenleitner, 1995 
 Knemodynerus albolimbatus Schulthess, 1914
 Knemodynerus australensis (Giordani Soika, 1986)
 Knemodynerus chiengmaiensis Gusenleitner, 1996  
 Knemodynerus circumspectus (Smith, 1860)
 Knemodynerus complanatus Giordani Soika, 1995
 Knemodynerus conspicuous Gusenleitner, 1992
 Knemodynerus coriaceus Giordani Soika, 1970
 Knemodynerus dancaliensis (Giordani Soika, 1989)
 Knemodynerus dictatorius (Giordani Soika, 1935)  
 Knemodynerus djarabubensis (Schulthess, 1928)
 Knemodynerus euodyneroides Gusenleitner, 1997
 Knemodynerus euryspilus (Cameron, 1910) 
 Knemodynerus excellens (Pérez, 1907)
 Knemodynerus expressus (Giordani Soika, 1934)
 Knemodynerus farquharensis (Cameron, 1907)
 Knemodynerus imitatus Gusenleitner, 2010
 Knemodynerus inversus Gusenleitner, 2004
 Knemodynerus lahijensis Gusenleitner, 2002
 Knemodynerus lahorensis (Ahmad & Ahsan, 1976)
 Knemodynerus longitegulae (Williams, 1928)
 Knemodynerus malickyi Gusenleitner, 1995
 Knemodynerus meyeri (Cameron, 1910)
 Knemodynerus nadigorum (Giordani Soika, 1979)
 Knemodynerus polyphemus (Kirby, 1888)
 Knemodynerus pseudocoriaceus Giordani Soika, 1970 
 Knemodynerus pseudolateralis (Meade-Waldo, 1915)
 Knemodynerus rhynchoides (Saussure, 1852)
 Knemodynerus seychellensis (Dalla Torre, 1904)
 Knemodynerus sinaiticus (Giordani Soika, 1939)
 Knemodynerus stigma (Saussure, 1863)
 Knemodynerus tanimbarensis Gusenleitner, 2008
 Knemodynerus tectus (Fabricius, 1781
 Knemodynerus turneri (Giordani Soika, 1934)

References

 Carpenter, J.M., J. Gusenleitner & M. Madl. 2010a. A Catalogue of the Eumeninae (Hymenoptera: Vespidae) of the Ethiopian Region excluding Malagasy Subregion. Part II: Genera Delta de Saussure 1885 to Zethus Fabricius 1804 and species incertae sedis. Linzer Biologischer Beitrage 42 (1): 95-315.

Biological pest control wasps
Potter wasps